Matariki is the name of the Pleiades star cluster in Māori culture in New Zealand, also a public holiday of the same name.

Matariki may also refer to:

Matariki (film), a 2010 New Zealand drama film
Matariki Court, a specialist court based in Kaikohe, Northland Region
Matariki Hospital, Te Awamutu, Waipa, New Zealand
Matariki Network of Universities, an international network of universities